Kathy Campbell (born Kathy Kuester, December 1, 1946) was a member of the state legislature in the U.S. state of Nebraska.

Campbell was born in Norfolk, Nebraska.  In 2008, she was elected to represent the 25th Nebraska legislative district, which encompasses the northeast quarter of Lancaster County including the city of Waverly and the eastern portions of the city of Lincoln.

In 2009, Campbell, with Bill Avery and Gwen Howard, introduced LB 136, a bill to expand the eligibility for children to qualify for the State's Children Health Insurance Program (SCHIP).

References

 

Living people
1946 births
Women state legislators in Nebraska
Republican Party Nebraska state senators
21st-century American politicians
People from Norfolk, Nebraska
21st-century American women politicians